Canal Fulton is a city in western Stark County, Ohio, United States, along the Tuscarawas River. The population was 5,325 at the time of the 2020 census. It is part of the Canton–Massillon metropolitan area.

History
Canal Fulton traces its history to three villages that developed along the Tuscarawas River. Milan was platted on March 23, 1814, by Matthew Rowland who arrived by ox team. It was the first settlement west of the Tuscarawas River in Stark County. Fulton was platted on May 16, 1826, changed its name to Canal Fulton in 1832, and later incorporated as a village. The present name is an amalgamation of the Ohio Canal and the name of a local pioneer, Ben Fulton. In 1843, President John Quincy Adams visited. In 1850 the first permanent community school began operation and railroad operations began. In 1853, Canal Fulton absorbed both Milan and West Fulton. In 1855, Union School building was completed and had two rooms accommodating 100 students. In 1869, the construction of railroad was completed on the west side of the river. 1870 Addition built at Union School. In 1873, The warehouse converted to Opera House. In 1874, Canal Fulton approves organization of a fire department, although one was in existence in the early 1800s. Fire department gets first modern steam-operated pumper. In 1875, Sts. Philip and James School founded.

In 1876, German immigrants came to area as strikebreakers for coal industry. In 1886, new school built to accommodate 12 grades.

Geography
Canal Fulton is located at  (40.889806, -81.595339), along the Tuscarawas River.

Demographics

2010 census
As of the census of 2010, there were 5,479 people, 2,186 households, and 1,488 families residing in the city. The racial makeup of the city was 97.0% White, 0.6% African American, 0.1% Native American, 0.4% Asian, 0.2% from other races, and 1.7% from two or more races. Hispanic or Latino of any race were 1.5% of the population.

There were 2,186 households, of which 32.3% had children under the age of 18 living with them, 52.4% were married couples living together, 12.1% had a female householder with no husband present, 3.5% had a male householder with no wife present, and 31.9% were non-families. 27.8% of all households were made up of individuals, and 12.9% had someone living alone who was 65 years of age or older. The average household size was 2.43 and the average family size was 2.95.

The median age in the city was 40.3 years. 23.1% of residents were under the age of 18; 8% were between the ages of 18 and 24; 25.4% were from 25 to 44; 25.9% were from 45 to 64; and 17.6% were 65 years of age or older. The gender makeup of the city was 47.2% male and 52.8% female.

2000 census

As of the census of 2000, there were 5,061 people, 1,823 households, and 1,349 families residing in the city. The population density was 2,090.8 people per square mile (807.5/km2). There were 1,925 housing units at an average density of 795.3 per square mile (307.1/km2). The racial makeup of the city was 97.27% White, 0.91% African American, 0.16% Native American, 0.41% Asian, 0.18% from other races, and 1.07% from two or more races. Hispanic or Latino of any race were 0.67% of the population.

There were 1,823 households, out of which 39.9% had children under the age of 18 living with them, 59.0% were married couples living together, 11.6% had a female householder with no husband present, and 26.0% were non-families. 22.1% of all households were made up of individuals, and 7.5% had someone living alone who was 65 years of age or older. The average household size was 2.65 and the average family size was 3.11.

In the city the population was spread out, with 27.6% under the age of 18, 8.4% from 18 to 24, 32.0% from 25 to 44, 20.7% from 45 to 64, and 11.3% who were 65 years of age or older. The median age was 34 years. For every 100 females, there were 88.7 males. For every 100 females age 18 and over, there were 84.5 males.

The median income for a household in the city was $45,359, and the median income for a family was $51,914. Males had a median income of $42,331 versus $23,540 for females. The per capita income for the city was $21,266. About 3.2% of families and 4.4% of the population were below the poverty line, including 4.8% of those under age 18 and none of those age 65 or over.

References

External links
 City website
 Canal Fulton Tourism
 Canal Fulton Chamber of Commerce

Cities in Stark County, Ohio
Cities in Ohio
1814 establishments in Ohio
Populated places established in 1814